Visa Veli Hongisto (born April 9, 1987 in Valkeala) is a Finnish sprinter. His club team is Valkealan Kajo. He is the son of Eeva Haimi.

Hongisto represented Finland at the 2008 Summer Olympics in Beijing. He competed at the 200 metres and placed fourth in his first round heat in a time of 20.62 seconds. He did not improve his time in the second round and finished in 20.76 seconds, placing sixth, which was not enough to qualify for the semi finals.

Progression

100m

200m

400m

Personal bests
 60m (indoor): 6,72 in Helsinki, 2006
 100m: 10,45 in Tampere, 2006
 200m: 20,56 in Osaka, 2007
 400m: 47.02 in Dessau, 2008

Physical characteristics
 Height: 184 cm
 Weight: 77 kg

References
 sports-reference
 Tilastopaja Oy

1987 births
Living people
People from Valkeala
Finnish male sprinters
Olympic athletes of Finland
Athletes (track and field) at the 2008 Summer Olympics
Sportspeople from Kymenlaakso